Charles Fane, 3rd Earl of Westmorland (6 January 1635 – 18 September 1691), styled Lord le Despenser between 1626 and 1666, of Apethorpe Hall, Northamptonshire was a British peer and twice Member of Parliament for Peterborough.

Life
Fane was the eldest son of Mildmay Fane, 2nd Earl of Westmorland and his first wife Grace Thornhurst, daughter of Sir William Thornhurst of Agnes Court, Kent. He was a student at Emmanuel College, Cambridge in 1649, and travelled abroad from 1652 to 1654 to France and the Netherlands. In 1660 he was elected Member of Parliament for Peterborough in the Convention Parliament. He appears to have been rather inactive in his period as Member of Parliament, having been a member of a total of five committees concerned with, amongst others, the drainage of the fens. He was re-elected MP for Peterborough in 1661 for the Cavalier Parliament, but was again inactive.

When his father died on 12 February 1666, Charles Fane inherited the earldom of Westmorland, as well as his father's further titles Baron Burghersh and Baron le Despencer. Due to his status as peer, he had to give up his seat in the House of Commons of England and instead entered the House of Lords. Though apparently an opponent of James II in 1684, he refused to take up arms against the King the year after. He died at the age of 56 and was buried at Apethorpe Hall.

Family

Fane married twice: first, to Elizabeth Nodes, daughter of Charles Nodes of Shephalbury, Hertfordshire on 15 June 1665. When she died, he remarried, this time to Lady Dorothy Brudenell, daughter to Robert Brudenell, 2nd Earl of Cardigan and his wife Lady Frances Savile. As he had no children by either wife, he was succeeded by his younger half-brother, Vere Fane, 4th Earl of Westmorland.

References

Literature

1635 births
1691 deaths
17th-century English nobility
Charles
English MPs 1660
English MPs 1661–1679
Earls of Westmorland
Barons le Despencer
Barons Burghersh